In the branch of mathematics known as additive combinatorics, Kneser's theorem can refer to one of several related theorems regarding the sizes of certain sumsets in abelian groups. These are named after Martin Kneser, who published them in 1953 and 1956. They may be regarded as extensions of the Cauchy–Davenport theorem, which also concerns sumsets in groups but is restricted to groups whose order is a prime number.

The first three statements deal with sumsets whose size (in various senses) is strictly smaller than the sum of the size of the summands.  The last statement deals with the case of equality for Haar measure in connected compact abelian groups.

Strict inequality

Cardinality
Let  be an abelian group.

This statement is a corollary of the statement for LCA groups below, obtained by specializing to the case where the ambient group is discrete.  A self-contained proof is provided in Nathanson's textbook.

Lower asymptotic density in the natural numbers
The main result of Kneser's 1953 article is a variant of Mann's theorem on Schnirelmann density.

 is finite,

and

Note that , since .

Haar measure in locally compact abelian (LCA) groups
We are forced to consider inner Haar measure, as the sumset of two -measurable sets can fail to be -measurable. Satz 1 of Kneser's 1956 article can be stated as follows:

Furthermore,

Equality in connected compact abelian groups

Examples where 

Satz 2 of Kneser's 1956 article says that all examples of sets satisfying equation with non-null summands are obvious modifications of these.

Notes

References
 

 

Theorems in combinatorics
Sumsets